The 1886 general election in Ireland took place from 1–27 July 1886 following the collapse of the Liberal government of William Gladstone after his failed attempt to implement Home Rule for Ireland.

In response to Gladstone's attempt to implement Home Rule a unionist wing of the Liberals broke off to found the Liberal Unionist Party, which entered into an alliance with the Conservatives in an effort to block any attempt to implement Home Rule.

Results
The Irish Liberal Party, having lost all seats in the 1885 election, saw its share of the vote further plummet, to 3%. In comparison, the relative share of the vote enjoyed by the Conservatives nearly doubled. This is explained by the fact that in this election, most southern Irish seats were uncontested as opposed to the previous year, so the Irish Parliamentary Party had no contests in seats they were popular and won in walkovers. Despite a drop in their relative share of the vote the Parliamentary party only lost one seat, with the bulk of their seats – 66 – being unopposed. In total the Parliamentary party stood some 97 candidates, the Conservatives 28 (three of whom were unopposed), the Liberal Unionists seven, and the Liberals just three.

Whilst the Liberal Unionists gained two seats – South Londonderry and South Tyrone – the Conservatives lost the seat of Belfast West to the Parliamentary party.

Not included in the totals are the two Dublin University seats, which were retained by Conservatives standing on a Unionist ticket.

See also
 History of Ireland (1801–1923)

References

1886
Ireland
July 1886 events
1886 elections in Ireland